The 2009–10 Montenegrin First League (also known as T-Com 1.CFL for sponsorship reasons) was the fourth season of the top-tier football in Montenegro. The season began on 8 August 2009 and ended on 29 May 2010. Mogren Budva are the defending champions.

Teams 
Jedinstvo Bijelo Polje were directly relegated to the Montenegrin Second League after finishing 12th in the 2008–09 season. Their place was taken by Second League champions Berane.

10th-placed Jezero Plav and 11th-placed Dečić Tuzi had to compete in two-legged relegation play-offs. Jezero were relegated by losing 2–1 on aggregate against the 3rd-placed team from Second League, Mornar Bar. On the other hand, Dečić saved their place in the Montenegrin top league by beating Mladost Podgorica, who had finished as runners-up of the Second League, also with 2–1 on aggregate.

Stadia and locations

League table

Results
The schedule consists of three rounds. During the first two rounds, each team played each other once home and away for a total of 22 matches. The pairings of the third round will then be set according to the standings after the first two rounds, giving every team a third game against each opponent for a total of 33 games per team.

First and second round

Third round
Key numbers for pairing determination (number marks position after 22 games):

Relegation play-offs
The 10th-placed team (against the 3rd-placed team of the Second League) and the 11th-placed team (against the runners-up of the Second League) will both compete in two-legged relegation play-offs after the end of the season.

Summary

Matches

2–2 on aggregate. Bar won on penalties.

Mornar won 2–1 on aggregate.

Top scorers

See also
 2009–10 Montenegrin Cup

References

External links
 Official page at Montenegrin FA website 

Montenegrin First League seasons
Monte
1